Ernie Thompson is a retired American football player in the National Football League who played running back for the Los Angeles Rams in 1991 and for the Kansas City Chiefs in 1993. Thompson played college football for Indiana University and was drafted by the Rams in the 12th round of the 1991 NFL Draft.

References

1969 births
American football running backs
Los Angeles Rams players
Kansas City Chiefs players
Indiana Hoosiers football players
Living people